Ctenoplusia aeneofusa is a moth of the family Noctuidae. It is found in the North-Eastern Himalayas.

Plusiinae
Moths described in 1894